Death Prefers Blondes is a young adult adventure book written by Caleb Roehrig and published in 2019 by Feiwel and Friends, a Macmillan Publishers imprint. It tells the story of Margo, a teen socialite that also executes heists during the night with a group of drag queens.

Reception 
Publishers Weekly gave the book a positive review, noting all the main characters are "likable, each contending with their own issues, making them relatable despite their less-than-legal hobby." The publication also commented on Roehrig's style of "infusing tongue-in-cheek humor into darker subject matters".

Maggie Reagan, writing for the Booklist, gave the book a starred review, praising the author's ability at "[b]alancing Oceans 11–level heists, corporate espionage, and gender and sexual identity politics" and calling it a "[c]lever, thrilling, and a wildly good time." The School Library Journal review started by calling it a "slow read", but continued by praising the characters and noting the "steamy LGBTQ and heterosexual romance" present in the book.

References 

2019 children's books
2010s LGBT novels
American children's books
American LGBT novels
Children's books with LGBT themes
Macmillan Publishers books
2019 LGBT-related literary works